To Blue Horizons is the tenth studio album by German band Bad Boys Blue. It was released on 26 March 1994 by Intercord. Three singles were also released. The record includes two international hits: "Go Go (Love Overload)" and "Luv 4 U".

Background
On this record, the band left its long-time label Coconut Records and producers Tony Hendrik and Karin Hartmann. As Trevor Bannister retired from the band, Bad Boys Blue became a duo again. John McInerney performed ten songs, and Andrew Thomas one.

The US edition of this album includes two additional songs "Don’t Be So Shy" and "Family Beat". These songs were later featured in the band's next album Bang Bang Bang.

Track listing
"Luv 4 U (Radio Mix)" – 3:42   
"Go Go (Love Overload)" – 3:45   
"Take A Chance" – 3:58   
"Is It You?" – 3:26   
"What Else? (Radio Mix)" – 3:12   
"Grand Illusion" – 3:42   
"Prove Your Love" – 3:27   
"One More Kiss" – 3:34   
"It Was Only Love" – 3:41   
"Say You'll Be Mine" – 3:44
"Love's Not Always Like Paradise" – 3:43

Chart performance
Finland — #25
Germany — #83

Personnel
Bad Boys Blue
John McInerney – lead vocal (tracks: 1 to 9, 11) 
Andrew Thomas – rap parts (1, 3, 6), lead vocal (tracks: 10)

Additional personnel
Arranged By [Additional] – Pit Schönpflug 
Bass – Michael Herzer 
Executive Producer – Holger Müller 
Guitar – Adax Dörsam, Olli Rosenberger
Keyboards – Horst Schnebel, Pit Schönpflug, Thomas Wörner 
Producer – Horst Schnebel (tracks: 2 to 4, 6 to 11), Rico Novarini (tracks: 1 5) 
Recorded By, Arranged By, Mixed By – Horst Schnebel
Vocals – Armin Ludäscher, Joana Terry, Joshi Dinier, Sandy Davis, Sheryl Hackett, Ute Berling

References

External links
ALBUM - To Blue Horizons
Bad Boys Blue – General Information

1994 albums
Bad Boys Blue albums